Already Gone is a 2019 American drama film written and directed by Christopher Kenneally and starring Tyler Dean Flores, Justine Skye, Seann William Scott and Shiloh Fernandez.  It is Kenneally's feature narrative directorial debut.  Keanu Reeves served as an executive producer of the film.

Synopsis
Robinson is a teenager who escapes his abusive stepfather and rescues 
Martin's girlfriend, Keesha, who is an exotic dancer. They run from Brooklyn, with Martin hunting them down, and meet an aspiring artist for whom Keesha begins to have feelings.

Cast
Tyler Dean Flores as Robinson
Justine Skye as Keesha
Shiloh Fernandez as Edwin
Seann William Scott as Martin
Raquel Castro as Carmen
Maga Uzo as Alma

References

External links
 
 

American drama films
2019 films
2019 drama films
2010s English-language films
2010s American films